Sidney Eugene King (August 22, 1906 — April 24, 2002) was an American painter and illustrator.

Life 

King was educated at the Boston Museum of Fine Arts, the Vesper George School of Art, the Copley School of Art, Federal School of Minneapolis, and Massachusetts School of Normal Art. King was the first artist to introduce oil paintings in an outdoor environment for the National Park Service. His works can be seen in most national parks east of the Mississippi River and at the Virginia Baptist Historical Society at the University of Richmond.

Legacy
On September 28, 2013, The Sidney E. King Arts Center opened in Bowling Green, Virginia.

References

External links

Sidney E. King Art Center

1906 births
2002 deaths
20th-century American painters
20th-century Baptists
21st-century Baptists
American art educators
American history painters
American illustrators
American male painters
Baptists from Massachusetts
Baptists from Virginia
Burials in Virginia
Educators from Virginia
Massachusetts College of Art and Design alumni
Museum of Fine Arts, Boston
People from Caroline County, Virginia
People from Dorchester, Massachusetts